Ruben Danaj (born 15 November 1994) is an Albanian professional footballer who plays as a forward for Kategoria e Parë club Besëlidhja.

References

1994 births
Living people
People from Lezhë
Association football forwards
Albanian footballers
Besëlidhja Lezhë players
KS Kastrioti players
KF Naftëtari Kuçovë players
KF Shënkolli players
Kategoria e Parë players
Kategoria e Dytë players